Asia Frigga Booth Clarke (November 19, 1835 – May 16, 1888) was a 19th-century American writer.

Early years
Asia Frigga Booth was the eighth in the family of ten children born to Junius Brutus Booth and his wife Mary Ann Holmes. Her famous brothers were Junius Brutus Booth Jr., Edwin Thomas Booth, and John Wilkes Booth. Asia was named for the continent where her father thought the Garden of Eden had been located.

Career
On April 28, 1859, Booth married John Sleeper Clarke at St. Paul's Episcopal Church, in Baltimore, Maryland.  The couple had eight children, two of whom, Creston (1865–1910) and Wilfred (1867–1945), became actors. Wilfred would later marry actress Victory Bateman.

Because the assassination of Abraham Lincoln in 1865 was committed by her brother, John Wilkes Booth, she and her husband emigrated to England, where they stayed until the end of their lives. Asia became a poet and writer, and through her work some insight was gained into the lives of the Booths, particularly John Wilkes. The Unlocked Book: John Wilkes Booth, a Sister's Memoir was written in 1874, but she kept its existence secret, fearing it would upset her husband. He had been imprisoned and forced to testify at the Lincoln assassination co-conspirators' trials, because of his family connection.

The memoir was published in 1938 by G. P. Putnam's Sons, when her heirs felt the public would be receptive. It was re-edited and republished in 1996 as John Wilkes Booth: A Sister's Memoir. Her other family memoirs, which she was able to publish during her lifetime, focused on the acting careers of her father and her brother Edwin Booth. The first, titled Booth memorials: Passages, incidents, and anecdotes in the life of Junius Brutus Booth (the Elder) by His Daughter, was published in December 1865, within a year of Lincoln's assassination.

Asia Booth Clarke is buried in the family plot at Greenmount Cemetery in Baltimore. Her brother, John Wilkes Booth, is also buried in the family plot.

Selected works
The Unlocked Book: John Wilkes Booth, a Sister's Memoir. 1938.

See also
 List of show business families

References

External links
 The Booth Collection, University of North Carolina

1835 births
1888 deaths
American expatriates in England
19th-century American memoirists
American women memoirists
American essayists
American people of English descent
People from Bel Air, Maryland
Writers from Bournemouth
Asia
American women essayists
Burials at Green Mount Cemetery
19th-century American women writers
19th-century essayists